Royal Canadian may refer to:

Military
 Lord Strathcona's Horse (Royal Canadians), a regiment of the Canadian army
 Royal Canadian Regiment (RCR), an infantry regiment of the Canadian army
 Royal Canadian Dragoons (RCD), an armoured regiment of the Canadian army
 Royal Canadian Engineers (RCE), a corps of the Canadian army

Other uses
 The Royal Canadians, a big band formed by Guy Lombardo
 Royal Canadian Institute (RCI, RCIS), an institute for the advancement of science
 Royal Canadian Academy of Arts (RCA, RCAA)
 Royal Canadian Bank, a defunct bank
 Royal Canadian Small Batch Canadian Whiskey, from Sazerac, see List of whisky brands

See also

Canadian royalty
Monarchy of Canada
Canadian royal symbols
Canadian peers and baronets
Monarchist League of Canada (Canadian royalists)

Royal Canadian College (disambiguation)
Canadian (disambiguation)
Royal (disambiguation)